This is a list of some notable organized crime figures within the underworld of Sri Lanka.

References

Sri Lankan mobsters
Sri Lankan criminals
Mobsters